My Cousin from Warsaw is a 1931 German comedy film directed by Carl Boese and starring Liane Haid, Tala Birell, and Fritz Schulz. It was shot at the Babelsberg Studios in Berlin. The film's art director was Julius von Borsody. A separate French language version Ma cousine de Varsovie was also made, directed by Carmine Gallone. The film was based upon the play by Louis Verneuil.

Cast
Liane Haid as Sonja, the cousin from Warsaw
Tala Birell as Lucienne
Fritz Schulz as Fred Carteret
S. Z. Sakall as Burel, Lucienne's Spouse 
Charles Puffy as Tobby
Paul Kemp as the Neighbor
Hugo Fischer-Köppe as Sonja's Chauffeur
Leo Peukert as doctor

Release
My Cousin from Warsaw was screened in Germany at the Titiana-Palast on 18 August 1931.

References

Bibliography
 Jacobsen, Wolfgang. Babelsberg: ein Filmstudio 1912-1992. Argon, 1992.

External links

German comedy films
1931 comedy films
Films of the Weimar Republic
Films directed by Carl Boese
German films based on plays
Films based on works by Louis Verneuil
German multilingual films
Cine-Allianz films
German black-and-white films
Films with screenplays by Franz Schulz
1931 multilingual films
1930s German films